The European route E9 is part of the United Nations international E-road network. It starts at Orléans, France, and goes south to Barcelona, Spain.

France 
In France, the E9 follows these roads:

: Orléans - Vierzon
: Vierzon - Châteauroux - Limoges - Cahors - Montauban - Toulouse
: Toulouse - A66 Junction
: A66 Junction - Foix
: Foix - Ax-les-Thermes - Spain

Spain 

In Spain, the E9 follows these roads:

: France — Puigcerdà
: Puigcerdà — Queixans
: Queixans — Riu de Cerdanya
: Riu de Cerdanya - Berga - Manresa - Terrassa - Barcelona

External links 
 UN Economic Commission for Europe: Overall Map of E-road Network (2007)

E009
E009
09